Harpalus poncei is a species of ground beetle in the subfamily Harpalinae. It was described by Will in 2001.

References

poncei
Beetles described in 2001